Hotel Krone is a traditional hotel in Matrei am Brenner, Austria founded in 1447.

The hotel building has a more than 1000 years history and always was in family ownership.

See also 
List of oldest companies

References

External links 
Homepage

Hotels in Austria
Restaurants in Austria
Companies established in the 15th century
15th-century establishments in Austria
Economy of Tyrol (state)
Hotels established in the 15th century